Saint-Pol-sur-Ternoise (literally Saint-Pol on Ternoise) is a commune in the Pas-de-Calais department in northern France. It is the seat of the canton of Saint-Pol-sur-Ternoise. The population of the town is 4,909 (2019).

History
The county of Saint-Pol-sur-Ternoise, usually referred to as just Saint-Pol, was originally a stronghold of the Counts of Flanders and was established as a county in the late 9th century. When the county passed out of the family of the Flemish counts, it remained subject to the Count of Flanders as his vassals until 1180. It became subject to France, then Artois (1237–1329), then France again until it ceased to exist as a county and was annexed to France in 1702.

Saint-Pol was first controlled by the Flemish counts, then by the family known as Campdavaine from early in the 11th century. In 1205 the county passed to the seigneurs of Châtillon through marriage, and remained with this dynasty until 1360 when it passed to the Luxembourg dynasty. Around 1487 the county passed to the Capetian-Bourbon-Vendôme dynasty through marriage, then to the Longueville-Neuchâtel dynasty from around 1563. In 1702 it came under direct rule of France.

In the Middle Ages, several of the Counts of Saint-Pol were active in the Crusades.

On 7 November 1920, the remains of four unidentifiable, fallen British soldiers disinterred from the battlefields at Aisne, Arras, the Somme and Ypres were brought to the town's chapel. There, Brigadier-General Louis John Wyatt of the North Staffordshire Regiment, aided by Lieutenant-Colonel EAS Gell, selected one to be carried to Westminster Abbey to be re-buried in the Tomb of the Unknown Warrior. The remaining three bodies were removed and reburied in the military cemetery  at Wyatt's headquarters at St Pol.

Population

Notable people

Saint-Pol-sur-Ternoise was the birthplace of Marie de St Pol (c1303-1377), foundress of Pembroke College, Cambridge.

Saint-Pol-sur-Ternoise was the birthplace of Pierre Repp (1909–1986), humorist and actor.

Saint-Pol-sur-Ternoise was the birthplace of Martial Joseph Armand Herman (1749-1795), a politician of the French Revolution, and temporary French Foreign Minister.

Nicolas Aubriot, footballer

See also
Counts of Saint-Pol
Communes of the Pas-de-Calais department

References

Communes of Pas-de-Calais
 
County of Artois